Jean Desessard (born 6 September 1952) is a French politician and a former member of the Senate of France. He represented Paris and is a member of Europe Ecology – The Greens.

References
Page on the Senate website 

1952 births
Living people
French Senators of the Fifth Republic
Place of birth missing (living people)
Senators of Paris